This is a list of cemeteries in Estonia.

Harju County

Tallinn
St. Barbara's Cemetery (14th century – 1710)
Hiiu-Rahu Cemetery (est. 1919)
St John's Almshouse Cemetery
Kalamaja Cemetery
Kopli Cemetery
Liiva Cemetery
Maarjamäe German military Cemetery
Metsakalmistu
Mõigu Cemetery
Pärnamäe Cemetery (est. 1963)
Pirita new Cemetery (est. 1898)
Pirita old Cemetery (est. 1436)
Pirita German war prisoners' Cemetery (1944–1950)
Rahumäe Cemetery (est. 1903)
Jewish Cemetery (est. 1911)
Firemen's Cemetery (est. 1927)
Siselinna Cemetery
Alexander Nevsky Cemetery (est. 1775)
Old Charles' Cemetery (est. 1864)
Military Cemetery (est. 1887)
Polish Catholic Cemetery (1844 – demolished 1950s)
Old Jewish Cemetery (18th century – demolished 1963)
Muslim Cemetery (18th century – demolished 1950s?)
Cholera Cemetery (18th century)

Ida-Viru County
Siivertsi Cemetery

Järva County

Paide
Reopalu Cemetery
Sillaotsa Cemetery

Lääne County

Haapsalu
Metsakalmistu
Old Cemetery

Lihula
Lihula New Cemetery
Lihula-Chapel Cemetery
Lihula-Russian Cemetery
Tuudi-Sause Cemetery
Kirbla Cemetery

Nõva
Nõva Cemetery

Vormsi
Vormsi Cemetery

Pärnu County

Pärnu
Pärnu Alevi Cemetery
Metsakalmistu
Vana-Pärnu Cemetery

Saare County

Kuressaare
Kudjape Cemetery

Tartu County

Tartu
Lohkva Jewish Cemetery (est. 1935)
Tartu Old Jewish Cemetery (est. 1859)
Old Believers Cemetery
St. Paul's Cemetery
Alexander Nevsky Cemetery
Puiestee cemetery
New St. John's Cemetery
Old St. Peter's Cemetery
Raadi cemetery
Old St. John's cemetery
St. Peter's cemetery
St. Mary's cemetery
Uspensky cemetery
Military cemetery
University cemetery
Rahumäe cemetery

Estonia
 
Cemeteries